Section 42 can refer to :
 Section 42 of the Australian constitution
 In the US - Section 42 of the Internal Revenue Code - details the Low-Income Housing Tax Credit
 English Law  - A section of the Mental Health Act 1983 dealing with involuntary commitment
 English Law - Section 42 of the Offences against the Person Act 1861 (now replaced) dealt with common assault and battery
 In engineering, Section 42 of  IEC 60364 standard defines Thermal protection criteria for electrical installations